Woretemoeteryenner ( – 13 October 1847), also known as "Bung", "Pung", and "Margaret", was an Aboriginal Tasmanian woman who had children with George Briggs, an English convict. She worked as a sealer and kangaroo hunter. Woretemoeteryenner and her sisters are among the few Palawa people whose lives bridge the experience of Aboriginal people before and after European contact.

Early life
Woretemoeteryenner was born in the Cape Portland area of Van Diemen's Land (Tasmania). She was a member of the Cape Portland Tasmanian tribe, one of the nine Aboriginal nations in what is now Tasmania. Her father Mannalargenna was a leader of the Cape Portland Tasmanians. She had three sisters: Wapperty (Wobberrertee), Wottecowidyer, and Teekoolterme. Woretemoeteryenner and her sisters are among the few Palawa people whose lives bridge the experience of Aboriginal people before and after European contact on the island.

European contact
The life of the Palawa people changed significantly after contact with Europeans. The shipwrecked Sydney Cove four that there were large numbers of seals off the coast of Van Diemen's Land. Approximately two hundred European men lived in the Bass Strait islands. Some of them abducted Aboriginal women to be used as workers or concubines. In 1803 and 1804, the first European settlements were formed at Risdon Cove and Port Dalrymple, respectively.

Relationships

George Briggs 
George Briggs, born in England, came to what is now Australia in 1805 when he was fourteen years of age. Briggs became a sealer. He met Woretemoeteryenner and they likely lived together beginning around 1810. It is likely that the relationship was made with Mannalargenna's approval, since Briggs and Woretemoeteryenner's father were on good terms. She was referred to as "Mrs. Briggs" by Colonial officials and on her death certificate. 

Woretemoeteryenner gave birth to her children on the Bass Strait islands. She had a daughter named Dalrymple (Dolly) about 1812. She had three more daughters: Eliza, Mary (also known as Margaret), and an unnamed daughter, born in 1817, 1818 and 1819, respectively, who all died young. The unnamed daughter was killed during an attack by a group of Aboriginal people. A son named John was born in 1820. Woretemoeteryenner was sold by Briggs to another sealer for a guinea sometime after 1820.

Later life
Woretemoeteryenner was a sealer initially. By 1820, most of the seals had been hunted out at the Furneaux Group of the Bass Strait islands and they needed to travel farther to find seals to hunt. Woretemoeteryenner and others boarded boats to go to Île Amsterdam and Île Saint-Paul in the Indian Ocean. Aboriginal women and children were left by the ship's captain at Rodrigues due to bad weather. Abandoned, the group made it to the nearby island of Mauritius. Woretemoeteryenner was one of three women who survived the ordeal and was repatriated.

In 1832, she lived at the Wybalenna Aboriginal Settlement where she hunted kangaroo into 1841. She died at Perth on 13 October 1847.

Notes

References

1795 births
1847 deaths
Indigenous Tasmanian people
Australian hunters
Sealers